Douglas de Medeiros Rinaldi (born 29 August 1979) is a former Brazilian footballer who played as a midfielder. He retired in 2013.

Career
Born in Erval Seco, Rio Grande do Sul, Rinaldi started his career at the youth team of Criciúma. After failing to become a professional footballer, Rinaldi decided to quit football. However, after a trial with Santo Ângelo, he signed his first professional contract and stayed with the club until 2002 when he joined Italian side Trento. He returned to Brazil in the following year and after acquiring a European passport, Rinaldi spent the following years playing for Rio Grande do Sul based teams with brief overseas spells with Mataró and Apollon Kalamaria.

During the January 2007 transfer window, Rinaldi was signed on a six-month loan deal by Watford from Brazilian club Veranópolis. He made his first appearance for Watford in a 3–1 defeat at Tottenham Hotspur on 17 March 2007, coming on as a substitute. His performance gained praise from Watford manager Aidy Boothroyd. Rinaldi scored his first professional goal for Watford on 18 April 2007 in another 3–1 defeat, this time to Blackburn Rovers.

On 22 May 2007, Rinaldi signed a two-year contract with Watford for an initial fee of £250,000. He found chances hard to come by since joining on a long term contract and only featured in two of the Hornets' games in the 2007–08 season, which came in the League Cup against Gillingham (in which he scored) and Southend United. Rinaldi played in the reserve team during that season but failed to persuade Boothroyd to select him for the first team.

On 17 July 2008, Watford terminated Rinaldi's contract with immediate effect. He later returned to Brazil and joined Ehime FC in 2010. On 16 April 2010, Rinaldi left the club after only four months and returned to his native Brazil, playing a single match for the club from the island of Shikoku. He retired from football in 2013 after União Frederiquense failed to achieve promotion to Campeonato Gaúcho.

References

External links

ErvalSeco.com
 Douglas Rinaldi at playmakerstats.com (English version of ogol.com.br)

1979 births
Living people
Sportspeople from Rio Grande do Sul
Brazilian footballers
Brazilian expatriate footballers
Brazilian expatriate sportspeople in Spain
Brazilian expatriate sportspeople in Japan
Brazilian expatriate sportspeople in England
Premier League players
Watford F.C. players
J2 League players
Ehime FC players
Expatriate footballers in England
Brazilian people of Italian descent
CE Mataró players
Expatriate footballers in Japan
Association football midfielders